Louise Emmanuelle de Guzman Mabulo (born September 12, 1998) is a Filipino environmentalist, farmer, social entrepreneur and chef. She is the founder of The Cacao project, a seed-exchange and social business that works with over 200 farmers from the San Fernando area in the Philippines. In 2018 she was named Outstanding Young Farmer of the Philippines. In 2019, she won the award Young Champions of the Earth, awarded by the United Nations Environment Programme. She also won a fellowship with the Young Southeast Asian Leaders Initiative at Brown University. She was named part of the Forbes' list '30 under 30 Asia', as a featured honoree. She was also distinguished with the Friend of Humanity mention by the Friendship Ambassador Foundation.

Biography 
Mabulo was born in Manila, raised in Swansea, and later moved to Camarines Sur, where she lives.

When Typhoon Nock-ten struck the Philippines in 2016, destroying almost all of the food supply, she organized a social media campaign to raise funds, but identified the need for seeds to re-build the agricultural lands. The trees that remained standing were cacao trees which she knew produced a high-value crop. 

This led her to start the Cacao project which helps to mitigate climate change through providing resilient and resistant crops while and gives farmers an income. The project has trained 200 farmers in agroforestry techniques, planted over 70,000 trees across 70 hectares of land, restored two water sources and uses environmental friendly techniques for pest control and crop fertilization. She expects sales of about 11.2 million pesos and a gross margin of around 1 million pesos on 2020's initial cocoa harvest. The project also provides farmers with seeds for staple crops such as bok choy, pumpkin and okra.

Part of her advocacy efforts are directed towards changing the perceptions that people have over farmers and agriculture, particularly removing the stigma that farmers are poor, uneducated and have failed in traditional educational systems.

Through her work and advocacy, she builds an environment of respect and empowerment for farmers, since she believes agriculture is fundamental to address climate change:

Mabulo also founded The Culinary Lounge, a project that helps farmers by using local ingredients. She has been invited to speak at different international events.

Awards and recognitions 
She has taken part in chef contests since the age of 12, when she was a finalist at the Junior MasterChef Pinoy Edition. She won the Best Dessert in Asia Award at the Disciples des Escoffier Young Talent Trophy at the Restaurant and Bar Show in Hong Kong.
Louise is recognised by 50 Next under The World's 50 Best Restaurants Awarding Body as a Game-changing Producer.

References 

Living people
Filipino women in business
Filipino farmers
1998 births